Bernard Weyburne (15 October 1877 – 18 December 1970) was a New Zealand cricketer. He played in seven first-class matches for Wellington from 1896 to 1906.

See also
 List of Wellington representative cricketers

References

External links
 

1877 births
1970 deaths
New Zealand cricketers
Wellington cricketers
Cricketers from Christchurch